This is a list of notable events in country music that took place in 2012.

Events
 February 29 – Branson, Missouri, a city famous for its country music-oriented tourist attractions, sustained damage from the Leap Day tornadoes. Three of Branson's 50-plus theaters are extensively damaged.
 May 11 – ABC picks up Malibu Country, starring Reba McEntire, to series. The new series debuts in November but is later cancelled in May 2013 after 18 episodes.
 May 21 – Scott Borchetta announces the signing of Tim McGraw to Big Machine Records.
 June 4 – Sony Music Nashville closes its BNA Records division after 21 years of operation; all its artists and staff are transferred to Columbia Nashville.
 June 18 – Gail Gellman, manager for Sugarland, confirms that member Jennifer Nettles is expecting a baby in November with husband Justin Miller.
 August – Randy Travis is involved in a number of legal incidents, including a drunk driving incident where he was found sitting nude outside his wrecked vehicle and – as police officers were trying to take him into custody – making verbal threats to injure and kill the officers, and a domestic disturbance approximately two weeks later.
 August 14 – George Jones announces plans for a 60-date farewell tour, titled The Grand Tour, for 2013.
 August 18 – Wynonna Judd's husband Scott "Cactus" Moser, who plays drums in both her road band and Highway 101, is involved in a motorcycle crash in South Dakota which results in the amputation of a leg.
 September 25 – Country legend Loretta Lynn celebrates her 50th Anniversary as a member of the Grand Ole Opry. 
 September 26 – George Strait announces plans for a farewell tour, titled The Cowboy Rides Away, for 2013 and 2014. Strait revealed he will continue recording and will perform on special occasions.
 October 11 – Billboard changes its Hot Country Songs from an airplay-only chart to one that reflects both airplay and music downloads, similarly to the Hot 100. The airplay-only methodology is transferred to a new chart called Country Airplay. As a result of the new methodology, Taylor Swift's "We Are Never Ever Getting Back Together" – which had previously peaked at No. 13 – rebounds back up the chart and becomes the first No. 1 single under the new methodology. In the process, the song becomes the first to top both the country and Billboard Hot 100 charts since "Amazed" by Lonestar in March 2000 and – with nine weeks at No. 1 – is the longest running chart-topper on the country chart since "Almost Persuaded" by David Houston in 1966. The song also is the longest-running No. 1 country song ever by a female artist, topping Connie Smith's "Once a Day" (which logged eight weeks at No. 1 in 1964–1965).
 November 1 – Luken Communications and Jim Owens Entertainment relaunch The Nashville Network (TNN) as a digital broadcast television network.

Top hits of the year
The following songs placed within the Top 20 on the Hot Country Songs, Country Airplay or Canada Country charts in 2012:

Top new album releases
The following albums placed within the Top 50 on the Top Country Albums charts in 2012:

Other top albums
{| class="wikitable sortable"
|-
! width=45|US
! Album
! Artist
! Record Label
! Release Date
! Reference
|-
| align=center| 38
| 10 Great Songs
| Trace Adkins
| Capitol Nashville
| April 3
| align=center|
|-
| align=center| 17
| 47th Annual Academy ofCountry Music Awards 'ZinePak
| Various Artists
| ZinePak LLC/Walmart
| March 20
| align=center|
|-
| align=center| 16
| 190 Proof
| The Lacs
| Average Joe's
| April 3
| align=center|
|-
| align=center| 19
| Adventus
| The Departed
| Underground Sound
| November 13
| align=center|
|-
| align=center| 40
| AM Country Heaven
| Jason Eady
| Jason Eady
| April 10
| 
|-
| align=center| 32
| Amazing Grace
| Kenny Rogers
| Gaither Music Group
| October 9
| 
|-
| align=center| 12
| American Idol: Season 11: Highlights (EP)
| Skylar Laine
| 19 Recordings
| July 3
| 
|-
| align=center| 20
| And So It Goes
| Don Williams
| Sugar Hill
| June 19
| align=center|
|-
| align=center| 16
| Ashes and Roses
| Mary Chapin Carpenter
| Zoë
| June 12
| align=center|
|-
| align=center| 29
| Back Home Again: Gospel Favorites
| The Oak Ridge Boys
| Spring Hill
| May 22
| align=center|
|-
| align=center| 31
| Beer for Breakfast
| JB and the Moonshine Band
| Average Joe's
| March 6
| align=center|
|-
| align=center| 23
| Best Of: All My Rowdy Friends
| Hank Williams, Jr.
| Curb
| March 27
| 
|-
| align=center| 38
| Change My Mind
| Billy Ray Cyrus
| Blue Cadillac
| October 23
| align=center|
|-
| align=center| 50
| Christmas Time's A-Coming
| The Oak Ridge Boys
| Gaither Music Group
| September 25
| 
|-
| align=center| 32
| The Classic Christmas Album
| John Denver
| RCA
| October 2
| align=center|
|-
| align=center| 27
| The Classic Christmas Album
| Willie Nelson
| Columbia
| October 2
| 
|-
| align=center| 16
| The Classic Christmas Album
| Elvis Presley
| RCA
| October 2
| align=center|
|-
| align=center| 20
| Clear as Day/Christmas with Scotty McCreery
| Scotty McCreery
| 19/Interscope/Mercury Nashville
| October 30
| 
|-
| align=center| 12
| Country & Cold Cans (EP)
| Dierks Bentley
| Capitol Nashville
| August 21
| 
|-
| align=center| 44
| Country Christmas: 10 Great Songs
| Various Artists
| Capitol Nashville
| September 25
| align=center|
|-
| align=center| 40
| Country: The Everly Brothers
| The Everly Brothers
| Sony Music
| November 27
| 
|-
| align=center| 35
| Country: George Jones
| George Jones
| Sony Music
| November 27
| 
|-
| align=center| 48
| Dandelion
| Bart Crow
| Smith Music Group
| September 18
| 
|-
| align=center| 48
| Dirt Road Communion
| Chase Rice
| Dack Janiel's
| March 20
| 
|-
| align=center| 20
| The Essential Alan Jackson
| Alan Jackson
| Arista Nashville
| April 17
| align=center|
|-
| align=center| 14
| Famous for Killing Each Other: Musicfrom and Inspired by Hatfields & McCoys
| Kevin Costner and Modern West
| Madison Gate
| May 22
| 
|-
| align=center| 35
| The Farm
| The Farm
| All In/Elektra Nashville
| July 17
| 
|-
| align=center| 14
| Goin' Down Rockin': The Last Recordings
| Waylon Jennings
| Saguaro Road
| September 25
| align=center|
|-
| align=center| 30
| Good Guys
| Bucky Covington
| eOne Music
| September 11
| align=center|
|-
| align=center| 14
| Goodbye Normal Street
| Turnpike Troubadours
| Bossier City
| May 8
| align=center|
|-
| align=center| 35
| The Great Lost Hits
| George Jones
| Time–Life
| April 24
| 
|-
| align=center| 28
| The Greatest: The Number Ones
| Johnny Cash
| Legacy
| August 7
| align=center|
|-
| align=center| 24
| His and Hers
| Joey + Rory
| Vangard/Sugar Hill
| July 31
| align=center|
|-
| align=center| 11
| Hits and More
| Martina McBride
| RCA Nashville
| January 17
| align=center|
|-
| align=center| 27
| I Am an Elvis Fan
| Elvis Presley
| RCA
| July 31
| 
|-
| align=center| 20
| Icon
| Gary Allan
| MCA Nashville
| March 6
| 
|-
| align=center| 18
| It'z Just What We Do
| Florida Georgia Line
| Big Loud Mountain
| May 15
| align=center|
|-
| align=center| 23
| JT Hodges
| JT Hodges
| Show Dog-Universal Music
| August 21
| align=center|
|-
| align=center| 32
| KIN: Songs by Mary Karr & Rodney Crowell
| Various Artists
| Vanguard
| June 5
| align=center|
|-
| align=center| 42
| Lawless Soundtrack
| Various Artists
| Sony Music
| August 28
| 
|-
| align=center| 25
| Little Victories
| Chris Knight
| Drifter's Church
| September 11
| align=center|
|-
| align=center| 30
| Live (EP)
| Hunter Hayes
| Atlantic Nashville
| October 16
| 
|-
| align=center| 16
| Long Gone Daddy
| Hank Williams III
| Curb
| April 17
| align=center|
|-
| align=center| 33
| Midnight Special
| Uncle Kracker
| Sugar Hill
| November 20
| align=center|
|-
| align=center| 23
| Mud Digger: Volume 3
| Various Artists
| Average Joe's
| June 12
| 
|-
| align=center| 34
| The Music Inside: A CollaborationDedicated to Waylon Jennings, Volume Two
| Various Artists
| Average Joe's
| February 7
| 
|-
| align=center| 41
| Nashville, Vol. 1: Tear the Woodpile Down
| Marty Stuart
| Sugar Hill
| April 24
| 
|-
| align=center| 49
| Nobody in Nashville
| Logan Mize
| Big Yellow Dog
| March 13
| 
|-
| align=center| 13
| NOW That's What I Call Country Ballads
| Various Artists
| EMI
| January 24
| 
|-
| align=center| 48
| The Odessa Tapes
| The Flatlanders
| New West
| August 28
| align=center|
|-
| align=center| 50
| Original Album Series
| Blake Shelton
| Warner Bros. Nashville
| September 25
| align=center|
|-
| align=center| 19
| Playlist: The Very Best of Alan Jackson
| Alan Jackson
| Legacy
| October 9
| align=center|
|-
| align=center| 18
| Playlist: The Very Best of Montgomery Gentry
| Montgomery Gentry
| Legacy
| January 31
| 
|-
| align=center| 30
| Red Wings and Six Strings
| Frank Foster
| Frank Foster
| September 4
| 
|-
| align=center| 38
| Science of Flight
| Dirty River Boys
| DRB Music
| September 11
| align=center|
|-
| align=center| 42
| Shake It Down
| Six Market Blvd.
| 6mb
| May 22
| 
|-
| align=center| 15
| Songs We Wish We'd Written II
| Pat Green
| Sugar Hill
| May 8
| 
|-
| align=center| 41
| The Soul of Truth: Bootleg Vol. IV
| Johnny Cash
| Legacy
| April 3
| 
|-
| align=center| 47
| Suited Up and Ready (EP)
| The Mavericks
| Valory Music Group
| May 29
| 
|-
| align=center| 37
| Sunday Mornin' Singin| Rhonda Vincent
| Upper Management
| July 10
| 
|-
| align=center| 39
| Surrender
| Roger Creager
| Thirty Tigers
| January 17
| align=center|
|-
| align=center| 48
| That's Why I Pray (EP)
| Big & Rich
| Warner Bros. Nashville
| June 26
| 
|-
| align=center| 45
| Them Idiots: Whirled Tour
| Bill Engvall, Jeff Foxworthyand Larry the Cable Guy
| Warner Bros. Nashville
| March 13
| 
|-
| align=center| 24
| Thomas Rhett (EP)
| Thomas Rhett
| Valory Music Group
| August 28
| 
|-
| align=center| 38
| The Time Jumpers
| The Time Jumpers
| Rounder
| September 11
| align=center|
|-
| align=center| 38
| We Walk the Line: A Celebrationof the Music of Johnny Cash
| Various Artists
| Legacy
| August 7
| align=center|
|-
| align=center| 35
| Wreck & Ruin
| Kasey Chambersand Shane Nicholson
| Sugar Hill
| October 23
| 
|}

Deaths
 January 20 – Larry Butler, 69, producer for Kenny Rogers and other artists (natural causes)
 March 28 – Earl Scruggs, 88, Bluegrass musician. (natural causes)
April 25 – Mark McCoy, bassist for Micky & the Motorcars. (drowning)
April 29 – Kenny Roberts, 84, American country singer and yodeler "I Never See Maggie Alone" (natural causes)
May 6 – George Lindsey, 83, comedian-actor, co-star of Hee Haw
May 29 – Doc Watson, 89, folk-styled singer and guitarist whose music spanned into country and bluegrass, among many other genres (complications from a fall and colon surgery).
June 13 – Frances W. Preston, 83, music executive. President and CEO of Broadcast Music, Inc. from 1986 to 2004 (heart failure).
July 3 – Andy Griffith, 86, comedian-actor and country-gospel singer. Best known for the TV series The Andy Griffith Show and Matlock.
July 16 – Kitty Wells, 92, pioneering female country music superstar, best known for hits such as "It Wasn't God Who Made Honky Tonk Angels" (complications from a stroke).
September 7 – Rollin "Oscar" Sullivan, 93, American country music entertainer that was the "Oscar" half of Lonzo and Oscar.
September 30 – Raylene Rankin, 52, member of Canadian country group The Rankin Family. (breast cancer)
October 21 – Tim Johnson, 52, songwriter best known for his number one hit "Do You Believe Me Now" for Jimmy Wayne and for his work with Rory Lee Feek of Joey + Rory (cancer).
October 30 – Jan Crutchfield, 74, songwriter best known for "Statue of a Fool"
November 21 – Phil Stone, 57, disc jockey at KMOD-FM in Tulsa, Oklahoma, co-creator of the Roy D. Mercer character (heart attack)
November 23 – Frank Dycus, 72, songwriter of over 500 songs including the hits "Unwound" and  "Gonna Get a Life".

Hall of Fame Inductees
Bluegrass Hall of Fame Inductees
 Doyle Lawson
 Ralph Rinzler

Country Music Hall of Fame Inductees
 Hargus "Pig" Robbins (born 1938).
 Connie Smith (born 1941).
 Garth Brooks (born 1962).

Canadian Country Music Hall of Fame Inductees
 Johnny Burke
 Ralph Murphy

Major awards

American Country Awards
(presented December 10 in Las Vegas, Nevada)Artist of the Year – Luke BryanMale Artist of the Year – Luke BryanFemale Artist of the Year – Carrie UnderwoodGroup/Duo of the Year – Lady AntebellumTouring Artist of the Year – Jason AldeanAlbum of the Year – Tailgates & Tanlines, Luke BryanBreakthrough Artist of the Year – Jake OwenNew Artist of the Year – Lauren AlainaSingle of the Year – "I Don't Want This Night to End", Luke BryanMale Single of the Year – "I Don't Want This Night to End", Luke BryanFemale Single of the Year – "Over You", Miranda LambertDuo/Group Single of the Year – "We Owned the Night", Lady AntebellumBreakthrough Single of the Year – "You Don't Know Her Like I Do", Brantley GilbertNew Artist Single of the Year – "Wanted", Hunter HayesSingle by a Vocal Collaboration – "Remind Me", Brad Paisley feat. Carrie UnderwoodMusic Video of the Year – "I Don't Want This Night to End", Luke BryanMale Music Video of the Year – "I Don't Want This Night to End", Luke BryanFemale Music Video of the Year – "Over You", Miranda LambertDuo/Group Music Video of the Year – "Pontoon", Little Big TownNew Artist Music Video of the Year – "Wanted", Hunter HayesSong of the Year – "Springsteen", Eric Church

Academy of Country Music
(presented April 7, 2013 in Las Vegas, Nevada)Entertainer of the Year – Luke BryanTop Male Vocalist – Jason AldeanTop Female Vocalist – Miranda LambertTop Vocal Group – Little Big TownTop Vocal Duo – Thompson SquareTop New Male Vocalist – Brantley GilbertTop New Female Vocalist – Jana KramerTop New Duo/Group – Florida Georgia LineTop New Artist – Florida Georgia LineAlbum of the Year – Chief, Eric ChurchSingle Record of the Year – "Over You", Miranda LambertSong of the Year – "Over You", Miranda LambertVideo of the Year – "Tornado", Little Big TownVocal Event of the Year – "The Only Way I Know", Jason Aldean, Luke Bryan and Eric ChurchACM HonorsCliffie Stone Pioneer Award – Emmylou HarrisCliffie Stone Pioneer Award – Ricky SkaggsCliffie Stone Pioneer Award – Dwight YoakamCliffie Stone Pioneer Award – Billy SherrillCrystal Milestone Award – Kenny ChesneyCareer Achievement Award – Vince GillJim Reeves International Award – Alan JacksonMae Boren Axton Award – Gayle HolcombPoet's Award – Bobby BraddockPoet's Award – Roger MillerSongwriter of the Year – Dallas Davidson

 Americana Music Honors & Awards Album of the Year – This One's For Him: A Tribute to Guy Clark (Various Artists)Artist of the Year – Gillian WelchDuo/Group of the Year – The Civil WarsSong of the Year – "Alabama Pines" (Jason Isbell)Emerging Artist of the Year – Alabama ShakesInstrumentalist of the Year – David RawlingsLifetime Achievement: Songwriting – Richard ThompsonLifetime Achievement: Performance – Bonnie RaittLifetime Achievement: Instrumentalist – Booker T. JonesLifetime Achievement: Executive – Dennis Lord

American Music Awards
(presented November 18 in Los Angeles)Favorite Country Male Artist – Luke BryanFavorite Country Female Artist – Taylor SwiftFavorite Country Band/Duo/Group – Lady AntebellumFavorite Country Album – Blown Away, Carrie Underwood

 ARIA Awards 
(presented in Sydney on November 29, 2012)Best Country Album – Two Worlds Collide (The McClymonts)

Canadian Country Music Association
(presented September 9 in Saskatoon)Fans' Choice Award – Johnny ReidMale Artist of the Year – Dean BrodyFemale Artist of the Year – Carolyn Dawn JohnsonGroup or Duo of the Year – Hey RomeoSongwriter(s) of the Year – "Is It Friday Yet?", written by Gord Bamford, Roger Brown and Byron HillSingle of the Year – "They Don't Make 'Em Like That Anymore", Jason BlaineAlbum of the Year – Dirt, Dean BrodyTop Selling Album – Own the Night, Lady AntebellumTop Selling Canadian Album – Fire It Up, Johnny ReidCMT Video of the Year – "In This House", The StellasRising Star Award – Kira IsabellaRoots Artist or Group of the Year – Jimmy RankinGeneration Award – Taylor Swift

Country Music Association
(presented November 1 in Nashville)Single of the Year – "Pontoon", Little Big TownSong of the Year – "Over You", Miranda Lambert and Blake SheltonVocal Group of the Year – Little Big TownNew Artist of the Year – Hunter HayesAlbum of the Year – Chief, Eric ChurchMusician of the Year – Mac McAnallyVocal Duo of the Year – Thompson SquareMusic Video of the Year – "Red Solo Cup", Toby KeithMale Vocalist of the Year – Blake SheltonFemale Vocalist of the Year – Miranda LambertMusical Event of the Year – "Feel Like a Rock Star", Kenny Chesney and Tim McGrawEntertainer of the Year – Blake Shelton

CMT Music Awards
(presented June 6 in Nashville)Video of the Year – "Good Girl", Carrie UnderwoodMale Video of the Year – "I Don't Want This Night to End", Luke BryanFemale Video of the Year – "Over You", Miranda LambertGroup Video of the Year – "We Owned the Night", Lady AntebellumDuo Video of the Year – "I Got You", Thompson SquareUSA Weekend Breakthrough Video of the Year – "The Trouble with Girls", Scotty McCreeryCollaborative Video of the Year – "Remind Me", Brad Paisley and Carrie UnderwoodPerformance of the Year – "Tattoos on This Town", Jason Aldean from CMT Artists of the YearCMT Artists of the Year (presented December 9 in Nashville)
Jason Aldean
Luke Bryan
Kenny Chesney
Eric Church
Toby Keith
Miranda Lambert
Carrie Underwood

Grammy Awards
(presented February 10, 2013)Best Country Solo Performance – "Blown Away", Carrie UnderwoodBest Country Duo/Group Performance – "Pontoon", Little Big TownBest Country Song – "Blown Away", Josh Kear and Chris Tompkins (performed by Carrie Underwood)Best Country Album – Uncaged, Zac Brown BandBest Bluegrass Album – Nobody Knows You, Steep Canyon Rangers

Juno Awards
(presented April 21, 2013 in Regina)Country Album of the Year''' – Fire It Up'', Johnny Reid

See also
 Country Music Association
 Inductees of the Country Music Hall of Fame

References

External links

Country
Country music by year